Straw Donkey... The Singles is a music album by Carter the Unstoppable Sex Machine. Released on Chrysalis Records. The album is a compilation of singles by the band, some of which were not previously released in an album.

Track listing 
 "A Sheltered Life" - 4:03
 "Sheriff Fatman" - 4:43
 "Rubbish" - 3:05
 "Anytime Anyplace Anywhere" - 4:09
 "Bloodsport For All" - 5:03
 "After The Watershed (Early Learning the Hard Way)" - 4:27
 "The Only Living Boy In New Cross" - 3:55
 "Do Re Me So Far So Good" - 3:05
 "The Impossible Dream" - 5:15
 "Lean On Me I Won't Fall Over" - 3:41
 "Lenny And Terence" - 3:55
 "Glam Rock Cops" - 3:42
 "Let's Get Tattoos" - 2:48
 "The Young Offender's Mum" - 3:36
 "Born On The 5th Of November" - 11:22

References
 1995 in music
 Carter USM

External links 
 Carter the Unstoppable Sex Machine

Carter the Unstoppable Sex Machine albums
1995 compilation albums
Chrysalis Records compilation albums